The Basilica of Sainte-Anne-du-Congo (French: Basilique Sainte-Anne-du-Congo) is a monumental catholic church in Brazzaville, Republic of the Congo.

Construction 
The church was completed in 1943. The architect was Roger Erell.

References 

Buildings and structures in Brazzaville
Roman Catholic cathedrals in the Republic of the Congo
Roman Catholic churches completed in 1943
1943 establishments in French Equatorial Africa